The Citizens' Union "Civis", commonly known as simply as Civis (Cyrillic: Цивис), is a minor liberal and pro-European political party in Montenegro formed in 2020 from the non-governmental organization of the same name. Its founder and current leader is Srđan Pavićević, a surgeon and civic activist, who is also serving as the party's single representative in the Parliament of Montenegro, elected from the list of United Reform Action at the August 2020 parliamentary election.

History
The Civis was founded in April 2019 in Podgorica, as a political non-governmental organization, by group of Montenegrin civic activists, gathered around Srđan "Srđa" Pavićević, a surgeon and human rights activist. Civis was part of 2019 Montenegrin anti-corruption protests. Since its establishment, the organization cooperated closely with the parliamentary party United Reform Action, whose members were many of the founders of the organization. The political positions of Civis since its foundation are based on liberalism, europeanism, anti-corruption, technocracy and minority rights politics. At the 2020 parliamentary election Civis was part of the United Reform Action-led In Black and White electoral list. The list won 4 parliamentary seats at the election, one of which belonged to Civis.

Electoral performance

Parliamentary elections

After the election, Civis and URA continued their cooperation as part of the same parliamentary group.

References

2020 establishments in Montenegro
Pro-European political parties in Montenegro
Liberal parties in Montenegro
Political parties established in 2020